Spatial mismatch is the mismatch between where low-income households reside and suitable job opportunities. In its original formulation (see below) and in subsequent research, it has mostly been understood as a phenomenon affecting African-Americans, as a result of residential segregation, economic restructuring, and the suburbanization of employment.

Spatial mismatch was first proposed by John F. Kain in a seminal 1968 article, "Housing Segregation, Negro Employment, and Metropolitan Decentralization". That article did not specifically use the term "spatial mismatch", and Kain disclaimed credit. 

In 1987, William Julius Wilson was an important exponent, elaborating the role of economic restructuring, as well as the departure of the black middle-class, in the development of a ghetto underclass in the United States.

History

After World War I, many wealthy Americans started decentralizing out of the cities and into the suburbs. During the second half of the 20th century, department stores followed the trend of moving into the suburbs. In 1968, Kain formulated the “Spatial Mismatch Hypothesis”, but he did not refer to it by this term. His hypothesis was that black workers reside in segregated zones that are distant and poorly connected to major centers of growth. The phenomenon has many implications for inner-city residents dependent on low-level entry jobs. For example, distance from work centers can lead to increasing unemployment rates and further dampen poverty outcomes for the region at large. Since its conceptualization in the late 1960s, the spatial mismatch hypothesis has been widely cited to explain the economic problems encountered by inner-city minorities.

Factors
In 2007, Laurent Gobillon, Harris Selod, and Yves Zenou suggested that there are seven different factors that support the spatial mismatch phenomenon. Four factors are attributed to potential workers accessibility and initiatives. The remaining three factors stress employers' reluctance to divert away from the negative stigma of city people and in particular minorities when hiring.

Potential workers perspectives

Commuting cost is seen as an obstacle for inner-city people to be present for job interviews and furthermore to arrive to work everyday on time. In other words, cars may be too expensive for some workers and they may have to rely heavily on public transportation. Public transportation is problematic in a sense that it is not always prompt and may not stop at all job location sites.
Information access to jobs decreases as distance increases away from the job center. People who are living away from the job center are generally less knowledgeable about potential openings than individuals who live closer to the job center. Therefore, networking and information spillovers are of a major advantage in accessing information about potential openings.
There seems to be a lack of incentive for distance workers to search intensively for a job that is relatively far away. Gobillion, Selod and Zenou believe that minorities, more or less, do a tradeoff between short-term loss and long-term benefits. The short term loss involves making frequent search trips to distant work centers. However, the long-term benefit involves obtaining a stable job and thus a higher wage rate. Unfortunately, minorities tend to weigh the short-term loss higher than the long-term benefits and as a result, decrease their opportunity at obtaining a job in the suburbs.
There also seems to be a high search cost involve for urban workers looking for a job in the suburbs. It might be associated with paying a job agency to expand their search beyond the urban residential area or locating an agency in the suburbs.

China
Growth of ghost cities in China, mostly from not yet agglomerated areas between or adjacent metropolitan areas or coal mining towns, as in the case of the most famous example, Kangbashi New Area of Ordos, are an example of spatial mismatch.  In the case of places near metropolitan areas, it represents less of a risk going forward than in mining areas.

See also
 Involuntary unemployment
 Reverse commute
 Theory of alienation

References

Commuting
Employment
Geography
Unemployment
Waste of resources